In theatre, a thrust stage (also known as a platform stage or open stage) is one that extends into the audience on three sides and is connected to the backstage area by its upstage end. A thrust has the benefit of greater intimacy between performers and the audience than a proscenium, while retaining the utility of a backstage area. Entrances onto a thrust are most readily made from backstage, although some theatres provide for performers to enter through the audience using vomitory entrances. A theatre in the round, exposed on all sides to the audience, is without a backstage and relies entirely on entrances in the auditorium or from under the stage.
As with an arena, the audience in a thrust stage theatre may view the stage from three or more sides. Because the audience can view the performance from a variety of perspectives, it is usual for the blocking, props and scenery to receive thorough consideration to ensure that no perspective is blocked from view. A high backed chair, for instance, when placed stage right, could create a blind spot in the stage left action.

History

The thrust stage is the earliest stage type in western theatre, first appearing in Greek theatres, and its arrangement was continued by the pageant wagon. As pageant wagons evolved into Elizabethan theatre, many of that era's works, including those of Shakespeare, were performed on theatre with an open thrust stage, such as those of the Globe Theatre.

The thrust stage was generally out of use for centuries, and was resurrected by Orson Welles when he staged Doctor Faustus for the Federal Theatre Project in 1937. The thrust apron extended over three rows of seats at Maxine Elliott's Theatre, extending 20 feet. "It was constructed especially for the production and was probably one of the first to break out of the procenium arch in a Broadway playhouse," wrote critic Richard France.

The concept was used in 1953 by the Stratford Shakespeare Festival of Canada. Their Festival Theatre was originally under a tent, until a permanent thrust stage theatre facility was constructed in 1957. Since that time dozens of other thrust stage venues have been built using the concept.

Examples

North America

Canada
Prairie Theatre Exchange in Winnipeg, Manitoba
The Maclab Theatre at the Citadel Theatre in Edmonton, Alberta
The Festival Theatre at the Atlantic Theatre Festival in Wolfville, Nova Scotia
The Festival Theatre at the Stratford Shakespeare Festival in Stratford, Ontario
The Tom Patterson Theatre at the Stratford Shakespeare Festival in Stratford, Ontario
The Studio Theatre at the Stratford Shakespeare Festival in Stratford, Ontario
The Studio-théâtre at Place des Arts, Montreal, Quebec
The UFV Theatre at the University of the Fraser Valley in Chilliwack, British Columbia
The BMO Mainstage at Bard on the Beach in Vancouver, British Columbia
The Chief Dan George Theatre at the University of Victoria in Victoria, British Columbia

United States
Abbey Players Theater in Abbeville, Louisiana
Casa Manana in Fort Worth, TX
A Noise Within in Pasadena, CA
The ANTA Washington Square Theatre in Greenwich Village, New York (now demolished)
The Octagon Stage at the Alabama Shakespeare Festival in Montgomery, Alabama
The Mark Taper Forum in Los Angeles, CA
The Berkeley Repertory Theatre in Berkeley, CA 
The SLO Repertory Theatre in San Luis Obispo, CA
The PCPA Marian Theatre in Santa Maria, CA
The PCPA Solvang Festival Theatre in Solvang, CA  
The John W. Huntington Theatre at Hartford Stage in Hartford, Connecticut
The La Nouba stage in Downtown Disney in Florida
The Alhambra Dinner Theatre in Jacksonville, Florida
The Gateway Theatre in Chicago
The Chicago Shakespeare Theatre in Chicago
The Ethel M. Barber Theater at Northwestern University in Evanston, Illinois
The Guthrie Theater in Minneapolis
The Greenbelt Arts Center in Greenbelt, Maryland
The Purple Rose Theatre in Chelsea, Michigan
The Court Street Theatre in Nashua, New Hampshire
The Seacoast Repertory Theatre in Portsmouth, New Hampshire
The Crossroads Theater in New Brunswick, New Jersey
The George Street Playhouse in New Brunswick, New Jersey
The Circle in the Square Theatre, New York City
The Vivian Beaumont Theater at Lincoln Center, New York
The Mystère theater in the Treasure Island hotel in Paradise, Nevada
The Carolina Actors Studio Theatre in Charlotte, North Carolina
Elevation Church in Charlotte, North Carolina
The Paul Green Theatre at PlayMakers Repertory Company in Chapel Hill, North Carolina
Stewart Theatre on the campus of North Carolina State University in Raleigh, North Carolina
The O'Reilly Theater in Pittsburgh, Pennsylvania
The Kleberg Stage at the Zach Theatre in Austin, Texas
The Blackfriars Playhouse at the American Shakespeare Center in Staunton, Virginia
The Playhouse at the Overture Center for the Arts in Madison, Wisconsin
The American Players Theatre in Spring Green, Wisconsin
ArtsWest Playhouse and Gallery in Seattle, Washington
The Todd Wehr Theater at the Marcus Center for the Performing Arts in Milwaukee, Wisconsin
The Barksdale Theatre at the Shops at Willow Lawn in Richmond, Virginia
The Lowell Davies Festival Theatre at the Old Globe in San Diego, California
Centre Stage-South Carolina in Greenville, South Carolina
 Theatre Suburbia in Houston, Texas
 Playcrafters Barn Theatre in Moline, Illinois
 Shanklin Theatre, University of Evansville, Evansville, Indiana
 Shea's 710 Theatre, Buffalo, New York
 The Webb Theater in Saint Norbert College in De Pere, W
 The Zeider's American Dream Theater in Virginia Beach, Virginia

Europe

Germany
Waldbühne ("Forest Stage"), Berlin

Greece
Numerous Greek theatres, such as the one in Epidaurus

United Kingdom
The Questors Theatre, Ealing
The Crucible Theatre in Sheffield, England
The Gulbenkian Theatre in Canterbury, England
The Globe Theatre in London, England. All other Elizabethan theatres were also in the same style.
The Olivier Theatre in the National Theatre, London
The Everyman Theatre in Liverpool, England
The Chichester Festival Theatre. Notable for the fact that the stage is hexagonal, and is surrounded by the audience on three sides.
The Swan Theatre in Stratford-upon-Avon, England
The Courtyard Theatre in Stratford-upon-Avon, England
Elmbank Studios, Ayr
The Quarry Theatre at the West Yorkshire Playhouse, Leeds
The Riverside Theatre in Coleraine, Northern Ireland

Asia

India
Prithvi Theatre, Mumbai
Bharat Bhavan, Bhopal, Madhya Pradesh
Ranga Shankara, Bangalore
Jagriti Theatre, Bangalore
Bhartendu Natya Academy, Lucknow, Uttar Pradesh

Oceania

Australia
 The York Theatre, part of the Seymour Centre, Sydney
 The Roundhouse Theatre, part of WAAPA, Perth
 George Jenkins Theatre in Frankston, Victoria

References

External links
 

 Mystère theatre diagram Diagram of Cirque du Soleil's Mystère theatre
 Thrust stage diagram

Parts of a theatre